Audient is a British company based in Herriard, Hampshire, England that designs, manufactures, and markets mixing consoles, audio interfaces, microphone preamplifiers and signal processors.

History

Background
Audient was founded by David Dearden and Gareth Davies. Dearden started his recording career in 1968, moving to London two years later to work as a junior maintenance engineer at Advision Studios and later led the design of two Quad Eight consoles for the studio, one which was the first automated console in England. Dearden also worked with studio designer Eddie Veale, building a custom mixing console for John Lennon's private Ascot Sound Studios, as well as consoles for George Harrison, Ringo Starr, Gus Dudgeon, and Chris Squire.

Dearden met Gareth Davies while working at Soundcraft, and the two partnered in 1980 to co-found DDA (Dearden-Davies Associates) - a company known for designing mixing console in the 1980s and 1990s. After Klark Teknik's acquisition of DDA in 1986 and Midas the following year, Dearden designed the Midas XL200 and the initial concept of the Midas H1000.

Company
Audient was co-founded by Dearden and Davies in 1997. The company is based in Herriard (near Basingstoke, Hampshire, England), with employees in Bulgaria and throughout the UK. A widespread global distribution network is in place outside of the United Kingdom, with Audient taking British distribution in-house as of July 2010.

In 2013, Audient was purchased by Simon Blackwood.

Products

Mixing consoles
Audient's initial and flagship product is the ASP8024 large-format analog in-line recording console, originally introduced in 1998. An acronym for analogue signal processing, ASP Series consoles are built-to-order and fully customizable, available in configurations up to 60 channels, all with Class-A microphone preamplifiers, 2-band parametric equalizer with high and low shelving filter, and integrated patchbay, with available options including automation and DAW control. The company introduced a smaller, compact version of the console, the ASP4816, in 2012. In 2016, Audient updated the ASP8024 to the "Heritage Edition", with various internal design upgrades, as well as vintage-style cosmetic updates.

Preamps and processors
In 2006, Audient introduced the ASP008, which packaged 8-channels of the company's microphone preamplifiers in a 1U rackmountable chassis. A 2-channel version, the Mico, was introduced in 2009. In 2014 the company introduced the ASP880 as a replacement to the ASP008, adding the ASP800 to their preamplifier offerings the following year.

In 2008, Audient introduced the Black Series modular signal processing system, with available preamplifier, equalizer, compressor, AD converter, and master clock modules, along with a frame capable of housing, powering, and providing connectivity to up to 10 modules.

Audio interfaces
In 2013, Audient entered the audio interface market with the first iD Series interface, the iD22, introducing the iD14 the following year, the iD4 in 2016, and iD44 in 2019. In 2020, the company introduced the EVO Series audio interfaces, including the EVO 4 and EVO 8.

Notable users
Audient equipment is in use at many major studios worldwide, such as Abbey Road Studios, Pete Townshend's Eel Pie Studios and House of Blues, USA.

References

Manufacturing companies of the United Kingdom
Companies based in Hampshire
Audio mixing console manufacturers
Audio equipment manufacturers of the United Kingdom